Sayyideh Fatemeh Hosseini (born 1 April 1985) is an Iranian Reformist politician and a member of the Parliament of Iran representing Tehran, Rey, Shemiranat and Eslamshahr electoral district. Hosseini is currently the youngest member of the parliament.

She is daughter of Safdar Hosseini.

Career

Electoral history

References

1985 births
Living people
University of Tehran alumni
Amirkabir University of Technology alumni
Members of the 10th Islamic Consultative Assembly
Members of the Women's fraction of Islamic Consultative Assembly
Iranian consultants